Émile Kolb (3 July 1902 – 1 September 1967) was a Luxembourgian footballer. He competed at the 1924 Summer Olympics and the 1928 Summer Olympics.

References

External links
 

1902 births
1967 deaths
Luxembourgian footballers
Luxembourg international footballers
Olympic footballers of Luxembourg
Footballers at the 1924 Summer Olympics
Footballers at the 1928 Summer Olympics
People from Differdange
Association football defenders
FA Red Boys Differdange players